The Bottleneck is a location along the South-East Spur (also known as Abruzzi Spur), the most-used route to the summit of K2, the second-highest mountain in the world, in the Karakoram, on the border of Pakistan and China.

The Bottleneck is a narrow couloir, which is overhung by seracs from the ice field east of the summit. According to AdventureStats, 13 out of the last 14 fatalities on K2 have occurred at or near the Bottleneck.

Despite all the dangers, the Bottleneck is still technically the easiest and the fastest route to the summit.  Most climbers choose to use it to minimize time required to spend above  (the "death zone"). The standard route, the Abruzzi Spur (SE), as well as the Cesen route (SSE Ridge, which joins SE Ridge), and the American variety on the NE Ridge (traverse across E Face to SE Ridge), all attain the summit via the Bottleneck.

The climbers approaching the Bottleneck start from a shoulder, on almost level ground just below 8,000 m, where the highest camp is typically located. The bottom end of the couloir drops to the south face of the mountain, and it gradually steepens to 60 degrees just below the ice field. It is not possible to climb up the icefield, which rises straight up tens of metres; instead, one has to traverse leftwards at the bottom of the icefield  until it is possible to pass it.

It is possible to bypass the Bottleneck by climbing the cliffs on the left. However, due to the technical difficulty of this approach, it has only been done once, by Fritz Wiessner and Pasang Dawa Lama Sherpa on the 1939 American Karakoram expedition.

On August 4, 2009, Dave Watson became the first person to ski down the Bottleneck.

On February 5, 2021, Pakistani mountain climber Muhammad Ali Sadpara, John Snorri of Iceland, and Juan Pablo Mohr of Chile went missing near the bottleneck. By February 18, 2021, the climbers have been declared dead after rescue and recovery missions conducted by the Pakistani Army failed to spot them. On July 26, 2021, a team of sherpas discovered the dead bodies of the three climbers.

See also
 2008 K2 disaster

References

K2